Hemipneustes is an extinct genus of sea urchins belonging to the family Holasteridae.

These semi-infaunal detritivores lived during the Upper Cretaceous period, from 70.6 to 66.043 million years ago. Fossils of this genus have been found in the sediments of Netherlands, Belgium, Bulgaria, India, Iran, the Netherlands, Oman and Spain.

Description
Hemipneustes is a quite large sea urchin with a high-domed profile and a well-defined anterior sulcus.

List of species
 Hemipneustes africanus Deshayes In Agassiz & Desor, 1847
 Hemipneustes arabicus Ali, 1989 †
 Hemipneustes arnaudi Cotteau, 1892
 Hemipneustes compressus Noetling, 1897 †
 Hemipneustes cotteaui Lambert in Peron, 1887 †
 Hemipneustes delettrei Peron & Gauthier †
 Hemipneustes leymeriei Hébert, 1875 †
 Hemipneustes nicklesi Vidal, 1921 †
 Hemipneustes oculatus Cotteau, 1892 †
 Hemipneustes perrieri Cottreau, 1935 †
 Hemipneustes persicus Cotteau & Gauthier, 1895 †
 Hemipneustes pyrenaicus Hebert, 1875 †
 Hemipneustes sardanyolae Vidal, 1921 †
 Hemipneustes striatoradiatus (Leske, 1778) †
 Hemipneustes zuffardii Checchia-Rispoli, 1921 †

References

 WoRMS

Holasteroida
Cretaceous echinoderms
Cretaceous echinoderms of Europe